The Maha Wizaya Pagoda is a pagoda located on Shwedagon Pagoda Road in Dagon Township, Yangon, Myanmar. The pagoda, built in 1980, is located immediately south of the Shwedagon Pagoda on Dhammarakhita Hill. The enshrined relics were contributed by the King of Nepal, while the pagoda's hti (umbrella) was consecrated by Ne Win, the country's former leader. The construction of this particular pagoda is believed by some scholars to have been a form of merit-making on the part of Ne Win.

The pagoda was built to commemorate the convening of the First Congregation of All Orders for the Purification, Perpetuation and Propagation of Sasana in 1980, which formed the State Sangha Maha Nayaka Committee, a governmental regulatory body of Buddhist monks.

References

Buddhist temples in Yangon